Novaculite, also called Arkansas Stone, is a microcrystalline to cryptocrystalline rock type that consists of silica in the form of chert or flint. It is commonly white to grey or black in color, with a specific gravity that ranges from 2.2 to 2.5. It is used in the production of sharpening stones. It occurs in parts of Arkansas, Oklahoma, and Texas, as well as in Japan and parts of the Middle East. The name novaculite is derived from the Latin word novacula, meaning a sharp knife, dagger, or razor, in reference to its use in sharpening. The first recorded use of the term whetstone was in reference to a honing stone from Arkansas.

Occurrence
Novaculite beds are present in the Ouachita Mountains of Arkansas and Oklahoma, and in the Marathon Uplift and Solitario regions of Texas. Novaculite is very resistant to erosion and the beds stand out as ridges in the Ouachita Mountains. There are also occurrences in Japan, Syria, Lebanon, and Israel.

Origin
The novaculite beds of the south-central United States were deposited in the Ouachita Geosyncline, a deep-water marine trough, during Silurian to early Mississippian time. Sedimentation consisted primarily of siliceous skeletal particles of marine organisms such as sponge spicules and radiolaria, and very fine-grained, wind-blown quartz particles; there was very little argillaceous sedimentation during novaculite deposition. The novaculite beds were later subjected to folding and uplift, and probably low-grade metamorphism, during the Ouachita orogeny in early Pennsylvanian time.

Use

Because novaculite is very hard and dense, it has been mined since prehistoric times, first for use as arrow and spear points, and later to make sharpening stones. Novaculite-rich sharpening stones  from Arkansas are called Arkansas stones; stones produced in the Ottoman empire (Syria, Lebanon, and Israel) were called Turkey stones; and novaculite stones were also produced in Japan.

The weathered upper strata of Arkansas novaculite, known as tripoli or "rotten stone", are rich in silica and have found a niche market as a performance additive or filler in the coatings, adhesives, sealants, and elastomer industries. Tripoli is mined just east of Hot Springs, Arkansas by the Malvern Minerals Company.

References

 Folk, R.L., and E.F. McBride, 1976, The Caballos Novaculite revisited Part I: "origin of novaculite members . Journal of Sedimentary Petrology. 46659-669
 Folk, R.L., and E.F. McBride, 1978, Origin of the Caballos Novaculite. in S.J. Mazzullo, ed., Tectonics and Paleozoic facies of the Marathon Geosyncline, West Texas: Permian Basin Section, Society for Sedimentary Geology, SEPM, Publication no. 78-17:101-130.
 Frondel, C., 1962, The System of Mineralogy of J. D. and E. S. Dana, v. 3, Silica Minerals: 7th ed., John Wiley and Sons, New York, 334p.
 King, P.B., 1937, Geology of the Marathon Region, Texas, United States Geological Survey Professional Paper 187 
 Krumbein, W.C. and Sloss, L.L., 1963, Stratigraphy and Sedimentation: 2nd ed., W. H. Freeman and Company, San Francisco, 660p.
 Lowe, D.R., 1975, Regional Controls on Silica Sedimentation in the Ouachita System. Geological Society of America Bulletin. 86:1123-1127
 Lowe, D.R., 1976, Nonglacial varves in lower member of Arkansas Novaculite (Devonian), Arkansas and Oklahoma. American Association of Petroleum Geologists Bulletin. 60:2103-2116.
 Lowe, D.R., 1977, The Arkansas novaculite: some aspects of its physical sedimentation. in C.G. Stone, and others, eds., Symposium on the geology of the Ouachita Mountains. Arkansas Geological Commission Miscellaneous Publication 13:132-138.
 Lowe, D.R., 1989, Stratigraphy, sedimentology, and depositional setting of pre-orogenic rocks of the Ouachita Mountains, Arkansas and Oklahoma, in R.D. Hatcher, Jr., W.A. Thomas, and G.W. Viele, eds., The Appalachian-Ouachita orogen in the United States. The Geology of North America. F-2:575-590, Geological Society of America, Boulder.
 McBride, E.F., 1989, Stratigraphy and sedimentary history of Pre-Permian Paleozoic rocks of the Marathon uplift, in R.D. Hatcher, Jr., W.A. Thomas, and G.W. Viele, eds., The Appalachian-Ouachita orogen in the United States. The Geology of North America. F-2:603-620, Geological Society of America, Boulder.

External links
  Arkansas Geological Commission: Novaculite 
 Olympus, Polarized Light Microscopy Digital Image Gallery: Novaculite 
  Arkansas Archeological Survey: Arkansas Novaculite: A Virtual Comparative Collection

Minerals
Economic geology
Industrial minerals
Ouachita Mountains
Sedimentary rocks
Chert